Ashamed of Parents is a 1921 American drama film directed by Horace G. Plympton and written by Adeline Hendricks. The film stars Charles Eldridge, Jack Lionel Bohn, Edith Stockton, Walter McEvan and William J. Gross. The film was released by Warner Bros. on December 25, 1921.

Cast   
Charles Eldridge as Silas Wadsworth
Jack Lionel Bohn as Arthur Wadsworth
Edith Stockton as Marian Hancock
Walter McEvan as Albert Grimes
William J. Gross as Peter Trotwood

References

External links
 

1921 films
1920s English-language films
Silent American drama films
1921 drama films
Warner Bros. films
American silent feature films
American black-and-white films
1920s American films